Mungo Park (22 October 1836 – 19 June 1904) was a member of a famous family of Scottish golfers. He won the 1874 Open Championship held at Musselburgh Links.

Early life
He was born 22 October 1836 to farm labourer and occasional golfer James Park (1797–1873) and his wife Euphemia, née Kerr (1806–1860), at Quarry Houses in Musselburgh, which was to become one of the three towns that shared hosting responsibilities for The Open Championship through the 1870s and 1880s. He learned golf at the age of four, but then spent 20 years as a seaman.

Golf career
After his career as a seaman concluded he returned to his home town in the early 1870s and won the 1874 Open Championship on the Musselburgh Links. His winning score was 159 for 36 holes. He spent his later life working as a teacher, golf course designer and clubmaker. Park would go on to post four more top-10 finishes in The Open Championship between 1875 and 1881.

Golf course design
Park was the first club professional at Alnmouth Golf Club and it is believed by those associated with the club that he was also responsible for the design of the course.

Family
Park's brother Willie and his nephew Willie Park, Jr. both won The Open Championship. Mungo Park had a nephew, Mungo Park Jr., who was Wille, Jr's younger brother, who was also a professional golfer. Mungo Jr. spent some time in Argentina and won the Argentine Open three times, in 1905, 1907 and 1912.

Death
Park died of pernicious anemia in the Inveresk poorhouse.

Major championships

Wins (1)

Results timeline

Note: Park played only in the Open Championship.

WD = Withdrew
"T" indicates a tie for a place

References

External links
Report on the 1874 Open Championship from the official site

Scottish male golfers
Winners of men's major golf championships
Golfers from Musselburgh
1836 births
1904 deaths